A number of different symbols have been used to represent the Autonomous Administration of North and East Syria (NES), commonly known as Rojava. The Autonomous Administration adopted an official emblem in December 2018. The emblem consists of the words "Autonomous Administration" in Arabic, surrounded by seven red stars representing the regions of northeast Syria, as well as a branch of olives and spike of wheat, two crops grown in the region. Surrounding all of the symbols is the words "Autonomous Administration of North and East Syria" written in Arabic, Kurmanji, Syriac, and Turkish, the languages spoken in the region. The blue and yellow semicircles the whole emblem is put upon represents the Euphrates river and the "permanent spring" of the region. A flag with the Autonomous Administration's emblem on a white field is also used occasionally to represent the Administration itself.

One of the most commonly used flags, especially in Kurdish-majority areas, is the tricolor flag that was adopted by the Movement for a Democratic Society (TEV-DEM), a prominent democratic confederalist organization in the region. The green, yellow and red colors are traditionally associated with Kurdish people, for example in the modern Flag of Kurdistan. A horizontal tricolor with blue, yellow, and red is used by the Syriac Union Party and its military wing in areas with a significant Syriac-Assyrian presence.

Symbols used by the Administration

Other symbols commonly used in North and East Syria

Symbols of sub-regions

See also
Autonomous Administration of North and East Syria
Flag of Kurdistan
Flag of Syria
Assyrian flag
Aramean-Syriac flag

References

Politics of the Autonomous Administration of North and East Syria
Democratic Federation of Northern Syria
Kurdish nationalist symbols